"Hennesey'n Buddah" is a song from American rapper Snoop Dogg from his fifth album, Tha Last Meal. It was produced by Dr. Dre and Michael Elizondo, and it features singer Kokane. The promo single was released in 2001.

Charts

Notes 

Snoop Dogg songs
2001 singles
2001 songs
Song recordings produced by Dr. Dre
Songs written by Snoop Dogg
Songs written by Dr. Dre
Songs written by Mike Elizondo